Kosh may refer to:

Ukrainian culture
 Kosh otaman (16–18th centuries), an officer of the Zaporozhian Host
 Kosh or Kish, a military society of Zaporizhian Sich that was elected annually on January 1, October 1, and 2-3rd day of Easter
 Zvenyhorodka Kosh, the biggest military formation of Free Cossacks
 , a military formation of Ukraine (1917–1919)

Places
 Kosh, Armenia, a town in Armenia
 Mir Kosh, a village in Ghotki district, Sindh

Other uses
 John Kosh (known as simply Kosh), album cover designer and art director
 Kosh Naranek, a fictional character in the Babylon 5 television series
 KOSH, the ICAO code for Wittman Regional Airport

See also